The 2018 Supercoppa Italiana was the 22rd edition of the Supercoppa Italiana. It was contested by Juventus, the 2017–18 Serie A champions and Fiorentina, the 2017–18 Coppa Italia champions.

The match was played in La Spezia at Stadio Alberto Picco on 13 October 2018 and Fiorentina won his first title.

The match, initially scheduled for 25 August 2018 in La Spezia, was subsequently postponed by the LND to a date to be decided upon request by the companies involved. Once the CONI College of Guarantee reassigned the organization of Serie A and Serie B to the FIGC, the date of the Italian Super Cup was also identified on 13 October 2018.

Match

References 

Football in Italy
Sport in Italy
Football competitions in Italy
Supercoppa Italiana (women)
Juventus F.C. (women) matches